Tracy Bartram (born 17 June, London, UK) is an Australian comedian, radio personality, and podcaster. Although born in the UK, she grew up and resides in Melbourne, Australia.

She began performing stand-up comedy in 1989 while working in sales and marketing. Her first gig was a ten-minute stand-up comedy stint at the Hilton Hotel.

Career 
During her time at Fox FM Bartram  interviewed many people on her own show. Interviewees included Susan Sarandon, Kristin Davis, Anastacia, Ronan Keating, Matt Damon, Jodie Foster, Geoffrey Rush and Bob Geldof. After a two-year (2003–2005) break from radio she joined the Mix 101.1 team in March 2006 with the Tracy and Tim for Breakfast show (with Tim Smith).

References

External links 

Year of birth missing (living people)
Australian women comedians
Australian stand-up comedians
Australian radio personalities
Australian women radio presenters
Comedians from Melbourne
Australian women singers
Australian women writers
Living people
English emigrants to Australia